Stuck in the Sound is a French indie rock band formed in Paris in 2002. The current band line up consists of José Reis Fontão (lead vocals and guitar), Emmanuel Barichasse (lead guitar), Arno Bordas (bass guitar) and François Ernie (drums and backing vocals). The group are presently signed to Discograph Records and have to date released six studio albums; their first commercially released album Stuck In The Sound was released in 2004 and their most recent album, Billy Believe, was released in 2019.

History
Stuck in the Sound were formed in Paris in 2002. The four group members shared a love of the band Nirvana and its lead singer Kurt Cobain. The name "Stuck in the Sound" came from the fact that when the band first started they locked themselves in a cellar and made music, so they were literally "stuck in the sound". The group released their eponymous début studio album on 1 October 2004, on a compact disc produced by the band's own record label, Stuck Records. Some time after this, the band were signed by French record label Discograph. On 6 September 2006 the band released their first extended play, the Toy Boy EP, which contained four tracks, three of them from their second album.

Two months to the day after the release of the EP their second, although first commercially released, studio album Nevermind the Living Dead was released as a download, CD and LP in France and as a download in a number of other countries. Despite the album failing to enter any national charts, a number of tracks from Nevermind the Living Dead were featured on various compilation albums; "Never On the Radio" appeared on the Les Inrockuptibles Made In France compilation and "Toy Boy" was included on EMI France's L'Alternative Rock collection. In 2008, the song "Toy Boy" was included on the soundtrack of the video game Guitar Hero World Tour.

During the same year, the band began recording their third studio album. They released the single "Ouais" on 1 December 2008 to precede the album and on 26 January 2009, Shoegazing Kids was released to moderate commercial success, achieving a peak position of No. 69 on the French album chart and staying in the Top 200 for a total of six weeks. In France, the album sold over 10,000 copies. "Shoot Shoot", the second single from Shoegazing Kids was brought out on 29 June 2009. It helped establish a reputation and paved the way for a major international tour (France, Switzerland, Belgium, Germany, Austria).

With the album "Pursuit", the band introduced a type of rock music that was less raw, with compositions better arranged and more diverse compositions. "Survivor" and the music of Stuck in the Sound fully assumed the mantle of pop, proffering a well-polished album.

Their latest album, "Billy Believe", was released in March 2019, and the video Alright has more than 1 million views on YouTube.

Discography

Studio albums
Stuck in the Sound (2004)
Nevermind the Living Dead (2006)
Shoegazing Kids (2009)
Pursuit (2012)
Survivor (2016)
Billy Believe (2019)

Extended plays
Toy Boy (2006)

References

External links
Stuck in the Sound official website

French indie rock groups
Musical groups established in 2002
Musical quartets
2002 establishments in France
Musical groups from Paris